At the creation of Belgium in 1831, there were 2,739 municipalities in the country, which had fallen to 2,663 municipalities by 1961. Following a series of decisions and actions, carried out in 1975, 1983 and 2019, the fusion of the Belgian municipalities reduced the national total to 581 municipalities. Of these, the following is a list of the 262 municipalities in the Wallonia region of Belgium, showing the one or more municipalities that were fused into each new entity.

A 

 Aiseau-Presles
 Aiseau
 Pont-de-Loup
 Presles
 Roselies
 Amay
 Amay
 Ampsin
 Flône
 Jehay
 Ombret-Rawsa
 Amblève (in German Amel)
 Amblève
 Heppenbach
 Meyerode
 Andenne
 Andenne
 Bonneville
 Coutisse
 Landenne
 Maizeret
 Namêche
 Sclayn
 Seilles
 Thon
 Vezin
 Anderlues
 Anhée
 Anhée
 Annevoie-Rouillon
 Bioul
 Denée
 Haut-le-Wastia
 Sosoye
 Warnant
 Ans
 Ans
 Alleur
 Loncin
 Xhendremael
 Anthisnes
 Anthisnes
 Hody
 Tavier
 Villers-aux-Tours
 Antoing
 Antoing
 Bruyelle
 Calonne
 Fontenoy
 Maubray
 Péronnes-lez-Antoing
 Arlon
 Arlon
 Autelbas
 Bonnert
 Guirsch
 Heinsch
 Toernich
 Assesse
 Assesse
 Courrière
 Crupet
 Florée
 Maillen
 Sart-Bernard
 Sorinne-la-Longue
 Ath
 Ath
 Arbre
 Bouvignies
 Ghislenghien
 Gibecq
 Houtaing
 Irchonwelz
 Isières
 Lanquesaint
 Ligne
 Maffle
 Mainvault
 Meslin-l'Évêque
 Moulbaix
 Ormeignies
 Ostiches
 Rebaix
 Villers-Notre-Dame
 Villers-Saint-Amand
 Attert
 Attert
 Nobressart
 Nothomb
 Thiaumont
 Tontelange
 Aubange
 Aubange
 Athus
 Halanzy
 Rachecourt
 Aubel
 Awans
 Awans
 Fooz
 Hognoul
 Othée
 Villers-l'Évêque
 Aywaille
 Aywaille
 Ernonheid
 Harzé
 Sougné-Remouchamps

B 

 Baelen
 Baelen
 Membach
 Bassenge
 Bassenge
 Boirs
 Ében-Émael
 Glons
 Roclenge-sur-Geer
 Wonck
 Bastogne
 Bastogne
 Longvilly
 Noville-lez-Bastogne
 Villers-la-Bonne-Eau
 Wardin
 Beaumont
 Beaumont
 Barbençon
 Leugnies
 Leval-Chaudeville
 Renlies
 Solre-Saint-Géry
 Strée
 Thirimont
 Beauraing
 Beauraing
 Baronville
 Dion
 Felenne
 Feschaux
 Focant
 Froidfontaine
 Honnay
 Javingue
 Martouzin-Neuville
 Pondrôme
 Vonêche
 Wancennes
 Wiesme
 Winenne
 Beauvechain
 Beauvechain
 Hamme-Mille
 Tourinnes-la-Grosse
 Nodebais
 L'Écluse
 Belœil
 Belœil
 Aubechies
 Basècles
 Ellignies-Sainte-Anne
 Grandglise
 Quevaucamps
 Ramegnies
 Stambruges
 Thumaide
 Wadelincourt
 Berloz
 Berloz
 Corswarem
 Rosoux-Crenwick
 Bernissart
 Bernissart (1964)
 Bernissart
 Harchies
 Blaton
 Pommerœul (1964)
 Pommerœul
 Ville-Pommerœul
 Bertogne
 Bertogne
 Flamierge
 Longchamps
 Bertrix
 Bertrix
 Auby-sur-Semois
 Cugnon
 Jehonville
 Orgeo
 Beyne-Heusay
 Beyne-Heusay
 Bellaire
 Queue-du-Bois
 Bièvre
 Bièvre
 Graide
 Monceau-en-Ardenne (1964)
 Monceau-en-Ardenne
 Bellefontaine (Bièvre)
 Petit-Fays
 Naomé
 Oizy (1964)
 Oizy
 Baillamont
 Cornimont
 Grosfays
 Binche
 Binche (1882)
 Binche
 Battignies
 Bray
 Buvrinnes
 Épinois
 Leval-Trahegnies
 Péronnes-lez-Binche
 Ressaix
 Waudrez
 Blegny
 Barchon
 Housse
 Mortier
 Saint-Remy
 Saive
 Trembleur
 Bouillon
 Bouillon
 Bellevaux
 Corbionn
 Dohan
 Les Hayons
 Noirefontaine
 Poupehan
 Rochehaut
 Sensenruth
 Ucimont
 Vivy
 Boussu
 Boussu
 Hornu
 Braine-l'Alleud
 Braine-l'Alleud
 Lillois-Witterzée
 Ophain-Bois-Seigneur-Isaac
 Braine-le-Château
 Braine-le-Château
 Wauthier-Braine
 Braine-le-Comte
 Braine-le-Comte
 Hennuyères
 Henripont
 Petit-Rœulx-lez-Braine
 Ronquières
 Steenkerque
 Braives
 Braives
 Avennes
 Ciplet
 Fallais
 Fumal
 Latinne
 Tourinne
 Ville-en-Hesbaye
 Brugelette
 Brugelette
 Attre
 Cambron-Casteau
 Gages
 Mévergnies-lez-Lens
 Brunehaut
 Bléharies
 Guignies
 Hollain
 Howardries
 Jollain-Merlin
 Laplaigne
 Lesdain
 Rongy
 Wez-Velvain
 Büllingen  (Bullange)
 Büllingen
 Manderfeld
 Rocherath
 Burdinne
 Burdinne
 Hannêche
 Lamontzée
 Marneffe
 Oteppe (1952)
 Oteppe
 Vissoul
 Burg-Reuland
 
 Thommen
 Bütgenbach (Butgenbach)
 Bütgenbach
 Elsenborn

C 

 La Calamine (Kelmis)
 La Calamine
 Hergenrath
 Neu-Moresnet
 Celles
 Celles
 Escanaffles
 Molenbaix
 Popuelles
 Pottes
 Velaines
 Cerfontaine
 Cerfontaine
 Daussois
 Senzeille
 Silenrieux
 Soumoy
 Villers-Deux-Églises
 Chapelle-lez-Herlaimont
 Chapelle-lez-Herlaimont
 Godarville
 Piéton
 Charleroi
 Charleroi
 Couillet
 Dampremy
 Gilly
 Gosselies
 Goutroux
 Jumet
 Lodelinsart
 Marchienne-au-Pont
 Marcinelle
 Monceau-sur-Sambre
 Montignies-sur-Sambre
 Mont-sur-Marchienne
 Ransart
 Roux
 Chastre
 Chastre-Villeroux-Blanmont
 Cortil-Noirmont
 Gentinnes
 Saint-Géry
 Châtelet
 Châtelet
 Bouffioulx
 Châtelineau
 Chaudfontaine
 Chaudfontaine
 Beaufays
 Embourg
 Vaux-sous-Chèvremont
 Chaumont-Gistoux
 Chaumont-Gistoux
 Bonlez
 Corroy-le-Grand
 Dion-Valmont (1970)
 Dion-le-Mont
 Dion-le-Val
 Longueville
 Chièvres
Chièvres
Grosage
Huissignies
Ladeuze
Tongre-Notre-Dame
Tongre-Saint-Martin
 Chimay
 Chimay
 Baileux
 Bailièvre
 Bourlers
 Forges
 L'Escaillère
 Lompret
 Rièzes
 Robechies
 Saint-Remy
 Salles
 Vaulx
 Villers-la-Tour
 Virelles
 Chiny
 Chiny
 Izel
 Jamoigne
 Les Bulles
 Suxy
 Termes
 Ciney
 Ciney
 Achêne
 Braibant
 Chevetogne
 Conneux
 Leignon
 Pessoux
 Serinchamps
 Sovet
 Clavier
 Clavier
 Bois-et-Borsu
 Les Avins
 Ocquier
 Pailhe
 Terwagne
 Colfontaine
 Pâturages
 Warquignies
 Wasmes
 Comblain-au-Pont
 Comblain-au-Pont
 Poulseur
 Comines-Warneton
 Comines
 Bas-Warneton
 Houthem
 Ploegsteert
 Warneton
 Courcelles
 Courcelles
 Gouy-lez-Piéton
 Souvret
 Trazegnies
 Court-Saint-Étienne
 Couvin
 Couvin
 Aublain
 Boussu-en-Fagne
 Brûly
 Brûly-de-Pesche
 Cul-des-Sarts
 Dailly
 Frasnes-lez-Couvin
 Gonrieux
 Mariembourg
 Pesche
 Petigny
 Petite-Chapelle
 Presgaux
 Crisnée
 Crisnée
 Fize-le-Marsal
 Kemexhe
 Odeur
 Thys

D 

 Dalhem
 Dalhem
 Berneau
 Bombaye
 Feneur
 Mortroux
 Neufchâteau
 Saint-André
 Warsage
 Daverdisse
 Daverdisse
 Gembes
 Haut-Fays
 Porcheresse
 Dinant
 Dinant
 Anseremme
 Bouvignes
 Dréhance
 Falmagne
 Falmignoul
 Foy-Notre-Dame
 Furfooz
 Lisogne
 Sorinnes
 Thynes
 Dison
 Dison
 Andrimont
 Doische
 Doische
 Gimnée
 Gochenée
 Matagne-la-Grande
 Matagne-la-Petite
 Niverlée
 Romerée
 Soulme
 Vaucelles
 Vodelée
 Donceel
 Donceel
 Haneffe
 Jeneffe
 Limont
 Dour
 Dour
 Blaugies
 Élouges
 Wihéries
 Durbuy
 Durbuy
 Barvaux-sur-Ourthe
 Bende
 Bomal
 Borlon
 Grandhan
 Heyd
 Izier
 Septon
 Tohogne
 Villers-Sainte-Gertrude
 Wéris

E 

 Écaussinnes
 Écaussinnes-d'Enghien
 Écaussinnes-Lalaing
 Marche-lez-Écaussinnes
 Éghezée
 Éghezée
 Aische-en-Refail
 Bolinne
 Boneffe
 Branchon
 Dhuy
 Hanret
 Leuze
 Liernu
 Longchamps
 Mehaigne
 Noville-sur-Mehaigne
 Saint-Germain
 Taviers
 Upigny
 Waret-la-Chaussée
 Ellezelles
 Ellezelles
 Lahamaide
 Wodecq
 Enghien
 Enghien
 Marcq
 Petit-Enghien
 Engis
 Engis
 Clermont-sous-Huy
 Hermalle-sous-Huy
 Érezée
 Érezée
 Amonines
 Mormont
 Soy
 Erquelinnes
 Erquelinnes
 Bersillies-l'Abbaye
 Grand-Reng
 Hantes-Wihéries
 Montignies-Saint-Christophe
 Solre-sur-Sambre
 Esneux
 Esneux
 Tilff
 Estaimpuis
 Estaimpuis
 Bailleul
 Estaimbourg
 Évregnies
 Leers-Nord
 Néchin
 Saint-Léger
 Estinnes
 Croix-lez-Rouveroy
 Estinnes-au-Mont
 Estinnes-au-Val
 Faurœulx
 Haulchin
 Peissant
 Rouveroy
 Vellereille-les-Brayeux
 Vellereille-le-Sec
 Étalle
 Étalle
 Buzenol
 Chantemelle
 Sainte-Marie
 Vance
 Villers-sur-Semois
 Eupen
 Eupen
 Kettenis

F 

 Faimes
 Faimes (1970)
 Borlez
 Celles
 Les Waleffes
 Aineffe
 Viemme
 Farciennes
 Farciennes
 Pironchamps
 Fauvillers
 Fauvillers
 Hollange
 Tintange
 Fernelmont
 Bierwart
 Cortil-Wodon
 Forville
 Franc-Waret
 Hemptinne
 Hingeon
 Marchovelette
 Noville-les-Bois
 Pontillas
 Tillier
 Ferrières
 Ferrières
 My
 Vieuxville
 Werbomont
 Xhoris
 Fexhe-le-Haut-Clocher
 Fexhe-le-Haut-Clocher
 Freloux
 Noville
 Roloux
 Voroux-Goreux
 Flémalle
 Awirs (1964)
 Awirs
 Gleixhe
 Flémalle-Grande
 Flémalle-Haute (1969)
 Chokier
 Flémalle-Haute
 Ivoz-Ramet
 Mons-lez-Liège
 Fléron
 Fléron
 Magnée
 Retinne
 Romsée
 Fleurus
 Fleurus
 Brye
 Heppignies
 Lambusart
 Saint-Amand
 Wagnelée
 Wanfercée-Baulet
 Wangenies
 Flobecq
 Floreffe
 Floreffe
 Floriffoux
 Franière
 Soye
 Florennes
 Florennes
 Corenne
 Flavion
 Hanzinelle
 Hanzinne
 Hemptinne
 Morialmé
 Morville
 Rosée
 Saint-Aubin
 Thy-le-Bauduin
 Florenville
 Florenville
 Chassepierre
 Fontenoille
 Lacuisine
 Muno
 Sainte-Cécile
 Villers-devant-Orval
 Fontaine-l'Évêque
 Fontaine-l'Évêque
 Forchies-la-Marche
 Leernes
 Fosses-la-Ville
 Fosses-la-Ville
 Aisemont
 Le Roux
 Sart-Eustache
 Sart-Saint-Laurent
 Vitrival
 Frameries
 Frameries
 Eugies
 La Bouverie
 Noirchain
 Sars-la-Bruyère
 Frasnes-lez-Anvaing
 Anvaing (1932)
 Anvaing
 Ellignies-lez-Frasnes
 Arc-Wattripont (1971)
 Arc-Ainières
 Wattripont
 Buissenal
 Dergneau
 Forest
 Frasnes-lez-Buissenal
 Hacquegnies
 Herquegies
 Moustier
 Oeudeghien
 Saint-Sauveur
 Froidchapelle
 Froid-Chapelle (1964)
 Froid-Chapelle
 Fourbechies
 Boussu-lez-Walcourt
 Erpion
 Vergnies

G 

 Gedinne
 Gedinne
 Bourseigne-Neuve
 Bourseigne-Vieille
 Houdremont
 Louette-Saint-Denis
 Louette-Saint-Pierre
 Malvoisin
 Patignies
 Rienne
 Sart-Custinne
 Vencimont
 Willerzie
 Geer
 Geer
 Boëlhe
 Darion
 Hollogne-sur-Geer
 Lens-Saint-Servais
 Ligney
 Omal
 Gembloux
 Gembloux (1964)
 Gembloux
 Ernage
 Grand-Manil
 Lonzée
 Sauvenière
 Beuzet
 Bossière
 Bothey
 Corroy-le-Château
 Grand-Leez
 Isnes
 Mazy
 Genappe
 Genappe
 Baisy-Thy
 Bousval
 Glabais
 Houtain-le-Val
 Loupoigne
 Vieux-Genappe
 Ways
 Gerpinnes
 Gerpinnes
 Acoz
 Gougnies
 Joncret
 Loverval
 Villers-Poterie
 Gesves
 Gesves
 Faulx-les-Tombes
 Haltinne
 Mozet
 Sorée
 Gouvy
 Beho
 Bovigny
 Cherain
 Limerlé
 Montleban
 Grâce-Hollogne
 Grâce-Hollogne (1970)
 Grâce-Berleur
 Hollogne-aux-Pierres
 Bierset
 Horion-Hozémont
 Velroux
 Grez-Doiceau
 Grez-Doiceau
 Archennes
 Biez
 Bossut-Gottechain
 Nethen

H 

 Habay
 Anlier
 Habay-la-Neuve
 Habay-la-Vieille
 Hachy
 Houdemont
 Rulles
 Hamoir
 Hamoir
 Comblain-Fairon
 Filot
 Hamois
 Hamois
 Achet
 Emptinne
 Mohiville
 Natoye
 Schaltin
 Scy
 Ham-sur-Heure-Nalinnes
 Ham-sur-Heure
 Cour-sur-Heure
 Jamioulx
 Marbaix-la-Tour
 Nalinnes
 Hannut
 Hannut (1970)
 Hannut
 Abolens
 Avernas-le-Bauduin
 Bertrée
 Blehen
 Cras-Avernas
 Crehen
 Lens-Saint-Remy
 Poucet
 Villers-le-Peuplier
 Avin
 Grand-Hallet (1964)
 Grand-Hallet
 Petit-Hallet
 Wansin
 Merdorp
 Moxhe
 Thisnes
 Trognée
 Hastière
 Agimont
 Blaimont
 Hastière-Lavaux
 Hastière-par-delà
 Heer
 Hermeton-sur-Meuse
 Waulsort
 Havelange
 Havelange
 Barvaux-Condroz
 Flostoy
 Jeneffe
 Maffe
 Méan
 Miécret
 Porcheresse
 Verlée
 Hélécine
 Linsmeau
 Neerheylissem
 Opheylissem
 Hensies
 Hensies
 Hainin
 Montrœul-sur-Haine
 Thulin
 Herbeumont
 Herbeumont
 Saint-Médard
 Straimont
 Héron
 Héron
 Couthuin
 Lavoir
 Waret-l'Évêque
 Herstal
 Herstal
 Liers
 Milmort
 Vottem
 Herve
 Herve
 Battice
 Bolland
 Chaineux
 Charneux
 Grand-Rechain
 Julémont
 Xhendelesse
 Honnelles
 Angre
 Angreau
 Athis
 Autreppe
 Erquennes
 Fayt-le-Franc
 Marchipont
 Montignies-sur-Roc
 Onnezies
 Roisin
 Hotton
 Hotton
 Fronville
 Hampteau
 Marenne
 Houffalize
 Houffalize
 Mabompré
 Mont
 Nadrin
 Tailles
 Tavigny
 Wibrin
 Houyet
 Houyet
 Celles
 Ciergnon
 Custinne
 Finnevaux
 Hour
 Hulsonniaux
 Mesnil-Église
 Mesnil-Saint-Blaise
 Wanlin
 Huy
 Huy
 Ben-Ahin
 Tihange (1951)
 Tihange
 Neuville-sous-Huy

I 

 Incourt
 Incourt
 Glimes
 Opprebais
 Piétrebais
 Roux-Miroir
 Ittre
 Ittre
 Haut-Ittre
 Virginal-Samme

J 

 Jalhay
 Jalhay
 Sart-lez-Spa
 Jemeppe-sur-Sambre
 Jemeppe-sur-Sambre
 Balâtre
 Ham-sur-Sambre
 Mornimont
 Moustier-sur-Sambre
 Onoz
 Saint-Martin
 Spy
 Jodoigne
 Jodoigne
 Dongelberg
 Jauchelette
 Jodoigne-Souveraine
 Lathuy
 Mélin
 Piétrain
 Saint-Jean-Geest
 Saint-Remy-Geest
 Zétrud-Lumay
 Juprelle
 Juprelle
 Fexhe-Slins
 Lantin
 Paifve
 Slins
 Villers-Saint-Siméon
 Voroux-lez-Liers
 Wihogne
 Jurbise
 Jurbise
 Erbaut
 Erbisœul
 Herchies
 Masnuy-Saint-Jean
 Masnuy-Saint-Pierre

L 

 La Bruyère
 Bovesse
 Émines
 Meux
 Rhisnes
 Saint-Denis
 Villers-lez-Heest
 Warisoulx
 La Hulpe
 La Louvière
 La Louvière
 Boussoit
 Haine-Saint-Paul
 Haine-Saint-Pierre
 Houdeng-Aimeries
 Houdeng-Gœgnies
 Maurage
 Saint-Vaast
 Strépy-Bracquegnies
 Trivières
 La Roche-en-Ardenne
 La Roche-en-Ardenne
 Beausaint
 Halleux
 Hives
 Ortho
 Samrée
 Lasne
 Couture-Saint-Germain
 Lasne-Chapelle-Saint-Lambert
 Maransart
 Ohain
 Plancenoit
 Léglise
 Léglise
 Assenois
 Ébly
 Mellier
 Witry
 Lens
 Lens
 Bauffe
 Cambron-Saint-Vincent
 Lombise
 Montignies-lez-Lens
 Le Rœulx
 Le Rœulx
 Mignault
 Thieu
 Ville-sur-Haine (1964)
 Ville-sur-Haine
 Gottignies
 Les Bons Villers
 Frasnes-lez-Gosselies
 Mellet
 Rèves
 Villers-Perwin
 Wayaux
 Lessines
 Lessines
 Bois-de-Lessines
 Deux-Acren
 Ghoy
 Ogy
 Ollignies
 Papignies (1964)
 Papignies
 Wannebecq
 Leuze-en-Hainaut
 Leuze
 Blicquy
 Chapelle-à-Oie
 Chapelle-à-Wattines
 Gallaix
 Grandmetz
 Pipaix
 Thieulain
 Tourpes
 Willaupuis
 Libin
 Libin
 Anloy
 Ochamps
 Redu
 Smuid
 Transinne
 Villance
 Libramont-Chevigny
 Libramont
 Bras
 Freux
 Moircy
 Recogne
 Remagne
 Sainte-Marie-Chevigny
 Saint-Pierre
 Liège
 Liège
 Angleur
 Bressoux
 Chênée
 Glain
 Grivegnée
 Jupille-sur-Meuse
 Rocourt
 Wandre
 Lierneux
 Lierneux
 Arbrefontaine
 Bra
 Limbourg
 Limbourg
 Bilstain
 Goé
 Lincent
 Lincent
 Pellaines
 Racour
 Lobbes
 Lobbes
 Bienne-lez-Happart
 Mont-Sainte-Geneviève
 Sars-la-Buissière
 Lontzen
 Lontzen
 Herbesthal
 Walhorn

M 

 Malmedy
 Malmedy
 Bellevaux-Ligneuville
 Bévercé
 Manage
 Manage
 Bois-d'Haine
 Fayt-lez-Manage
 La Hestre (1970)
 La Hestre
 Bellecourt
 Manhay
 Dochamps
 Grandménil
 Harre
 Malempré
 Odeigne
 Vaux-Chavanne
 Marche-en-Famenne
 Marche-en-Famenne
 Aye
 Hargimont
 Humain
 On
 Roy
 Waha
 Marchin
 Marchin
 Vyle-et-Tharoul
 Martelange
 Meix-devant-Virton
 Meix-devant-Virton
 Gérouville
 Robelmont
 Sommethonne
 Villers-la-Loue
 Merbes-le-Château
 Merbes-le-Château
 Fontaine-Valmont
 Labuissière
 Merbes-Sainte-Marie
 Messancy
 Messancy
 Habergy
 Hondelange
 Sélange
 Wolkrange
 Mettet
 Mettet
 Biesme
 Biesmerée
 Ermeton-sur-Biert
 Furnaux
 Graux
 Oret
 Saint-Gérard
 Stave
 Modave
 Modave (1952)
 Modave
 Linchet
 Outrelouxhe
 Strée
 Vierset-Barse
 Momignies
 Momignies
 Beauwelz
 Forge-Philippe
 Macon
 Macquenoise
 Monceau-Imbrechies
 Seloignes
 Mons
 Mons (1972)
 Mons
 Cuesmes
 Ghlin
 Hyon
 Nimy
 Obourg
 Ciply
 Harmignies
 Harveng
 Havré
 Jemappes
 Flénu
 Jemappes
 Maisières
 Mesvin
 Nouvelles
 Saint-Denis
 Saint-Symphorien
 Spiennes
 Villers-Saint-Ghislain
 Mont-de-l'Enclus
 Amougies
 Anserœul
 Orroir
 Russeignies
 Montigny-le-Tilleul
 Montigny-le-Tilleul
 Landelies
 Mont-Saint-Guibert
 Mont-Saint-Guibert
 Corbais
 Hévillers
 Morlanwelz
 Morlanwelz-Mariemont
 Carnières
 Mont-Sainte-Aldegonde
 Mouscron
 Mouscron
 Dottignies
 Herseaux
 Luingne
 Musson
 Musson
 Mussy-la-Ville

N 

 Namur
 Namur
 Beez
 Belgrade
 Boninne
 Bouge
 Champion
 Cognelée
 Daussoulx
 Dave
 Erpent
 Flawinne
 Gelbressée
 Jambes
 Lives-sur-Meuse
 Loyers
 Malonne
 Marche-les-Dames
 Naninne
 Saint-Marc
 Saint-Servais
 Suarlée
 Temploux
 Vedrin
 Wépion
 Wierde
 Nandrin
 Nandrin
 Saint-Séverin
 Villers-le-Temple
 Yernée-Fraineux
 Nassogne
 Nassogne
 Ambly
 Bande
 Forrières
 Grune
 Harsin
 Lesterny
 Masbourg
 Neufchâteau
 Neufchâteau
 Grandvoir
 Grapfontaine
 Hamipré
 Longlier
 Tournay
 Neupré
 Éhein
 Neuville-en-Condroz
 Plainevaux
 Rotheux-Rimière
 Nivelles
 Nivelles
 Baulers
 Bornival
 Monstreux
 Thines

O 

 Ohey
 Ohey
 Évelette
 Goesnes
 Haillot
 Jallet
 Perwez
 Olne
 Onhaye
 Onhaye
 Anthée
 Falaën
 Gerin
 Serville
 Sommière
 Weillen
 Oreye
 Oreye
 Bergilers
 Grandville
 Lens-sur-Geer
 Otrange
 Orp-Jauche
 Jandrain-Jandrenouille
 Jauche (1970)
 Jauche
 Énines
 Folx-les-Caves
 Marilles
 Noduwez
 Orp-le-Grand
 Ottignies-Louvain-la-Neuve
 Céroux-Mousty
 Limelette
 Louvain-la-Neuve
 Ottignies
 Ouffet
 Ouffet
 Ellemelle
 Warzée
 Oupeye
 Oupeye
 Haccourt
 Hermalle-sous-Argenteau
 Hermée
 Heure-le-Romain
 Houtain-Saint-Siméon
 Vivegnis

P 

 Paliseul
 Paliseul
 Carlsbourg
 Fays-les-Veneurs
 Framont, Wallonia
 Maissin
 Nollevaux
 Offagne
 Opont
 Pecq
 Pecq (before fusion)
 Esquelmes
 Hérinnes
 Obigies
 Warcoing
 Pepinster
 Pepinster (1964)
 Pepinster
 Cornesse
 Soiron
 Wegnez
 Péruwelz
 Péruwelz
 Baugnies
 Bon-Secours
 Braffe
 Brasménil
 Bury
 Callenelle
 Roucourt
 Wasmes-Audemez-Briffœil
 Wiers
 Perwez
 Perwez
 Malèves-Sainte-Marie-Wastines
 Orbais
 Thorembais-les-Béguines
 Thorembais-Saint-Trond
 Philippeville
 Philippeville
 Fagnolle
 Franchimont
 Jamagne
 Jamiolle
 Merlemont
 Neuville
 Omezée
 Roly
 Romedenne
 Samart
 Sart-en-Fagne
 Sautour
 Surice
 Villers-en-Fagne
 Villers-le-Gambon
 Vodecée
 Plombières
 Gemmenich
 Hombourg
 Montzen
 Moresnet
 Sippenaeken
 Pont-à-Celles
 Pont-à-Celles
 Buzet
 Luttre (1964)
 Luttre
 Liberchies
 Obaix
 Thiméon
 Viesville
 Profondeville
 Profondeville
 Arbre
 Bois-de-Villers
 Lesve
 Lustin
 Rivière

Q 

 Quaregnon
 Quaregnon
 Wasmuel
 Quévy
 Asquillies
 Aulnois
 Blaregnies
 Bougnies
 Genly
 Givry
 Gœgnies-Chaussée
 Havay
 Quévy-le-Grand
 Quévy-le-Petit
 Quiévrain
 Quiévrain
 Audregnies
 Baisieux

R 

 Raeren
 Raeren
 Eynatten
 Hauset
 Ramillies
 Autre-Église
 Gérompont (1970)
 Bomal
 Geest-Gérompont-Petit-Rosière
 Mont-Saint-André
 Grand-Rosière-Hottomont
 Huppaye
 Ramillies-Offus
 Rebecq
 Bierghes - which was Wisbecq, taken from Saintes
 Quenast
 Rebecq-Rognon
 Remicourt
 Remicourt
 Hodeige
 Momalle
 Pousset
 Rendeux
 Rendeux
 Beffe
 Hodister
 Marcourt
 Rixensart
 Rixensart
 Genval
 Rosières
 Rochefort
 Rochefort
 Ave-et-Auffe
 Buissonville
 Éprave
 Han-sur-Lesse
 Jemelle
 Lavaux-Sainte-Anne
 Lessive
 Mont-Gauthier
 Villers-sur-Lesse
 Wavreille
 Rouvroy
 Dampicourt
 Harnoncourt
 Lamorteau
 Torgny (village)
 Rumes
 Rumes
 La Glanerie
 Taintignies

S 

 Sainte-Ode
 Sainte-Ode
 Amberloup
 Lavacherie
 Tillet
 Saint-Georges-sur-Meuse
 Saint-Ghislain
 Saint-Ghislain
 Baudour
 Hautrage
 Neufmaison, Wallonia
 Sirault
 Tertre
 Villerot
 Saint-Hubert
 Saint-Hubert
 Arville
 Awenne
 Hatrival
 Mirwart
 Vesqueville
 Saint-Léger
 Saint-Léger
 Châtillon
 Meix-le-Tige
 Saint-Nicolas
 Saint-Nicolas
 Montegnée
 Tilleur
 Saint-Vith (Sankt-Vith)
 Saint-Vith
 Crombach
 Lommersweiler
 Recht
 Schönberg
 Sambreville
 Arsimont
 Auvelais
 Falisolle
 Keumiée
 Moignelée
 Tamines
 Velaine
 Seneffe
 Seneffe
 Arquennes
 Familleureux
 Feluy
 Petit-Rœulx-lez-Nivelles
 Seraing
 Seraing
 Boncelles
 Jemeppe-sur-Meuse
 Ougrée
 Silly
 Silly
 Bassilly
 Fouleng
 Gondregnies
 Graty
 Hellebecq
 Hoves
 Thoricourt
 Sivry-Rance
 Grandrieu
 Montbliart
 Rance
 Sautin
 Sivry
 Soignies
 Soignies
 Casteau
 Chaussée-Notre-Dame-Louvignies
 Horrues
 Naast
 Neufvilles
 Thieusies
 Sombreffe
 Sombreffe
 Boignée
 Ligny
 Tongrinne
 Somme-Leuze
 Somme-Leuze
 Baillonville
 Bonsin
 Heure
 Hogne
 Nettinne
 Noiseux
 Sinsin
 Waillet
 Soumagne
 Soumagne
 Ayeneux
 Cerexhe-Heuseux
 Évegnée-Tignée (1949)
 Évegnée
 Tignée
 Mélen
 Micheroux
 Spa
 Sprimont
 Sprimont
 Dolembreux
 Gomzé-Andoumont
 Louveigné
 Rouvreux
 Stavelot
 Stavelot
 Francorchamps
 Stoumont
 Stoumont
 Chevron
 La Gleize
 Lorcé
 Rahier

T 

 Tellin
 Tellin
 Bure
 Grupont
 Resteigne
 Tenneville
 Tenneville
 Champlon
 Erneuville
 Theux
 Theux
 La Reid
 Polleur
 Thimister-Clermont
 Clermont (Thimister)
 Thimister
 Thuin
 Thuin
 Biercée
 Biesme-sous-Thuin
 Donstiennes
 Gozée
 Leers-et-Fosteau
 Ragnies
 Thuillies
 Tinlot
 Abée
 Fraiture
 Ramelot
 Seny
 Soheit-Tinlot
 Tintigny
 Tintigny
 Bellefontaine
 Rossignol
 Saint-Vincent
 Tournai
 Tournai
 Barry
 Beclers
 Blandain
 Chercq
 Ere
 Esplechin
 Froidmont
 Froyennes
 Gaurain-Ramecroix
 Havinnes
 Hertain
 Kain
 Lamain
 Marquain
 Maulde
 Melles
 Mont-Saint-Aubert
 Mourcourt
 Orcq
 Quartes
 Ramegnies-Chin
 Rumillies
 Saint-Maur
 Templeuve
 Thimougies
 Vaulx
 Vezon
 Warchin
 Willemeau
 Trois-Ponts
 Trois-Ponts (1970)
 Fosse
 Wanne
 Basse-Bodeux
 Trooz
 Forêt
 Fraipont
 Nessonvaux
 Tubize
 Tubize (1970)
 Tubize
 Oisquercq
 Clabecq
 Saintes - a part of which was (Wisbecq) ceded to Rebecq

V 

 Vaux-sur-Sûre
 Hompré
 Juseret
 Sibret
 Vaux-sur-Sûre (1970)
 Morhet
 Nives
 Vaux-lez-Rosières
 Verlaine
 Verlaine
 Bodegnée
 Chapon-Seraing
 Seraing-le-Château
 Verviers
 Verviers
 Ensival
 Heusy
 Lambermont
 Petit-Rechain
 Stembert
 Vielsalm
 Vielsalm
 Bihain
 Grand-Halleux
 Petit-Thier
 Villers-la-Ville
 Villers-la-Ville
 Marbais
 Mellery
 Sart-Dames-Avelines
 Tilly
 Villers-le-Bouillet
 Villers-le-Bouillet
 Fize-Fontaine
 Vaux-et-Borset
 Vieux-Waleffe
 Warnant-Dreye
 Viroinval
 Dourbes
 Le Mesnil
 Mazée
 Nismes
 Oignies-en-Thiérache
 Olloy-sur-Viroin
 Treignes
 Vierves-sur-Viroin
 Virton
 Virton
 Bleid
 Ethe
 Latour
 Ruette
 Saint-Mard
 Visé
 Visé
 Argenteau
 Cheratte
 Lanaye
 Lixhe
 Richelle
 Vresse-sur-Semois
 Vresse (1964)
 Vresse
 Laforêt
 Alle (1964)
 Alle
 Chairière
 Mouzaive
 Bohan (1964)
 Bohan
 Membre
 Nafraiture
 Orchimont
 Sugny (1964)
 Sugny
 Bagimont
 Pussemange

W 

 Waimes
 Waimes
 Faymonville
 Robertville
 Walcourt
 Walcourt
 Berzée
 Castillon
 Chastrès
 Clermont
 Fontenelle
 Fraire
 Gourdinne
 Laneffe
 Pry
 Rognée
 Somzée
 Tarcienne
 Thy-le-Château
 Vogenée
 Yves-Gomezée
 Walhain
 Walhain-Saint-Paul
 Nil-Saint-Vincent-Saint-Martin
 Tourinnes-Saint-Lambert
 Wanze
 Wanze
 Antheit
 Bas-Oha
 Huccorgne
 Moha
 Vinalmont
 Waremme
 Waremme
 Bettincourt
 Bleret
 Bovenistier
 Grand-Axhe
 Lantremange
 Oleye
 Wasseiges
 Wasseiges
 Acosse
 Ambresin
 Meeffe
 Waterloo
 Waterloo (+ Hameau du Chenois, ceded to Braine-l'Alleud)
 Wavre
 Wavre
 Bierges
 Limal
 Welkenraedt
 Welkenraedt
 Henri-Chapelle
 Wellin
 Wellin
 Chanly
 Halma
 Lomprez
 Sohier

Y 

 Yvoir
 Yvoir
 Dorinne
 Durnal
 Évrehailles
 Godinne
 Houx, Belgium
 Mont
 Mont-Godinne
 Purnode
 Spontin

See also

 List of municipalities of Belgium
 List of cities in Wallonia

 
Walloon Region, fusion
Municipalities of Wallonia